Dinmore railway station is located on the Main line in Queensland, Australia. It serves the suburb of Dinmore in the City of Ipswich.

Services
Dinmore is served by trains operating to and from Ipswich and Rosewood. Most city-bound services run to Caboolture and Nambour, with some morning peak trains terminating at Bowen Hills. Some afternoon inbound services on weekdays run to Kippa-Ring. Dinmore is eleven minutes from Ipswich and 47 minutes on an all-stops train from Central.

Services by platform

*Note: One weekday morning service (4:56am from Central) and selected afternoon peak services continue through to Rosewood.  At all other times, a change of train is required at Ipswich.

References

External links

Dinmore station Queensland Rail
Dinmore station Queensland's Railways on the Internet

Railway stations in Ipswich City
Main Line railway, Queensland